1998 in sports describes the year's events in world sport.

Alpine skiing
 Alpine Skiing World Cup
 Men's overall season champion: Hermann Maier, Austria
 Women's overall season champion: Katja Seizinger, Germany

American football
 Super Bowl XXXII – the Denver Broncos (AFC) won 31–24 over the Green Bay Packers (NFC)
Location: San Diego Stadium
Attendance: 68,912
MVP: Terrell Davis, RB (Denver)
 Rose Bowl (1997 season):
 The Michigan Wolverines won 21–16 over the Washington State Cougars to win the AP Poll national championship
 The Orange Bowl was the original venue for the championship game, but the Big Ten Conference was not a part of the Bowl Alliance, so the game instead featured the #2 Nebraska Cornhuskers and the #3 Tennessee Volunteers
 January 13 – ABC and ESPN negotiate a $1.15 billion per season contract to keep Monday Night Football.
 December 13 – The Baltimore Ravens and Minnesota Vikings return an NFL record 3 kickoff returns for touchdowns.

Artistic gymnastics
 1998 Summer Goodwill Games - held in New York City, United States
 Mixed pairs champions: China (Ling Jie, Huang Xu)
 Women's all-around champion: Dominique Moceanu, United States
 Women's vault champion: Vanessa Atler, United States
 Women's uneven bars champion: Svetlana Khorkina, Russian Federation
 Women's balance beam champion: Kristen Maloney, United States
 Women's floor exercise champion: Vanessa Atler, United States
 Men's all-around champion: Ivan Ivankov, Belarus
 Men's vault champion: Sergei Fedorchenko, Kazakhstan
 Men's floor exercise champion: Alexei Nemov, Russian Federation
 Men's parallel bars champion: Huang Xu, China
 Men's pommel horse champion: Nikolai Kryukov, Russian Federation
 Men's still rings champion: Chris Lamorte, United States
 Men's horizontal bar champion: Ivan Ivankov, Belarus
 1998 European Gymnastics Championships - held in Saint Petersburg, Russia
 Women's team champions: Romania 
 Women's all-around champion: Svetlana Khorkina, Russian Federation
 Women's vault champion: Adrienn Varga, Hungary
 Women's uneven bars champion:Svetlana Khorkina, Russian Federation
 Women's balance beam champion: Evgenia Kuznetsova, Russian Federation
 Women's floor exercise champion: (tied) Corina Ungureanu, Romania / Svetlana Khorkina, Russian Federation
 Men's team champions: France
 Men's all-around champion: Alexei Bondarenko, Russian Federation
 Men's vault champion: Ioannis Melissanidis, Greece
 Men's floor exercise champion: Alexei Nemov, Russian Federation
 Men's still rings champion: Szilveszter Csollány, Hungary
 Men's parallel bars champion: Alexei Bondarenko, Russian Federation
 Men's horizontal bar champion: Jesús Carballo, Spain
 Men's pommel horse champion: Éric Poujade, France

Association football

 FIFA World Cup - France beat Brazil 3–0
 Champions League – Real Madrid C.F. beat Juventus F.C. 1–0	
 UEFA Cup – F.C. Internazionale Milano beat S.S. Lazio 3–0	
 Copa Libertadores – CR Vasco da Gama beat Barcelona Sporting Club 4–1 (Agg.)
 Ecuador - Ecuadorian Serie A Champions: Liga Deportiva Universitaria de Quito

Athletics
 August – 1998 European Championships in Athletics held at Budapest
 September – 1998 Commonwealth Games held at Kuala Lumpur
 December – 1998 Asian Games held at Bangkok

Australian rules football
 Australian Football League
 The Adelaide Crows win the 102nd AFL premiership and second premiership in a row by 35 points (Adelaide Crows 15.15 (105) d North Melbourne 8.22 (70))
 Brownlow Medal awarded to Robert Harvey (St Kilda)

Baseball
 The National League expands adding the Arizona Diamondbacks, and the American League expands adding the Tampa Bay Devil Rays.
 The Milwaukee Brewers move from the American League to the National League.
 Mark McGwire and Sammy Sosa each chase the home run record set previously by Roger Maris in 1961. Both men end up breaking the record; McGwire with 70 and Sosa with 66.
 Rookie 20-year-old Kerry Wood strikes out 20 Houston Astros to tie the major league single game strikeout record
 Cal Ripken Jr. ends his consecutive game streak at 2,632 in Baltimore against the New York Yankees. It was the first time he wasn't in the lineup since 1982.
 World Series – New York Yankees win 4 games to 0 over the San Diego Padres. The Series MVP is Scott Brosius, New York

Basketball
 July 1 – The NBA locked out its players and the season was put on hold for the next 6½ months and the season began under a 50–game schedule.
 NCAA Men's Basketball Championship –
 Kentucky wins 78–69 over Utah
 NBA Finals –
 Chicago Bulls win 4 games to 2 over the Utah Jazz, to complete their second three–peat of the decade.
 WNBA Finals –
 Houston Comets win two games to one over the Phoenix Mercury to repeat as champions.
 FIBA World Championship
 Yugoslavia World Champion
 National Basketball League (Australia) Finals:
 Adelaide 36ers defeated the South East Melbourne Magic 2–0 in the best–of–three final series.

Boxing
 May 17 to May 24 – 32nd European Amateur Boxing Championships held at Minsk, Belarus
 June 27 – Shane Mosley stopped Wilfrido Ruiz in the 5th round to retain the IBF Lightweight Championship

Canadian football
 Grey Cup – Calgary Stampeders win 26–24 over the Hamilton Tiger-Cats
 Vanier Cup – Saskatchewan Huskies win 24–17 over the Concordia Stingers

Curling
 Curling makes its Winter Olympics debut:
 Men's Gold: Switzerland wins 9–3 over Canada
 Women's Gold: Canada wins 7–5 over Denmark

Cycling
 Giro d'Italia won by Marco Pantani of Italy
 Tour de France – Marco Pantani of Italy
 UCI Road World Championships – Men's road race – Oskar Camenzind of Switzerland

Dogsled racing
 Iditarod Trail Sled Dog Race Champion
 Jeff King wins with lead dogs: Red & Rocket

Field hockey
 Men's World Cup: Netherlands
 Men's Commonwealth Games: Australia
 Men's Champions Trophy: Netherlands
 Women's World Cup: Australia
 Women's Commonwealth Games: Australia

Figure skating
 World Figure Skating Championships –
 Men's champion: Alexei Yagudin, Russia
 Ladies' champion: Michelle Kwan, United States
 Pairs' champions: Elena Berezhnaya / Anton Sikharulidze, Russia
 Ice dancing champions: Anjelika Krylova / Oleg Ovsyannikov, Russia

Floorball 
 Men's World Floorball Championships
 Champion: Sweden
 European Cup
 Men's champion: Warberg IC
 Women's champion: Högdalens AIS

Gaelic Athletic Association
 Camogie
 All–Ireland Camogie Champion: Cork
 National Camogie League: Cork
 Gaelic football
 All-Ireland Senior Football Championship – Galway 1–14 died Kiladre 1–10
 National Football League – Offaly 0–9 died Derry 0–7
 Ladies' Gaelic football
 All–Ireland Senior Football Champion: Waterford
 National Football League: Waterford
 Hurling
 All-Ireland Senior Hurling Championship – Offaly 2–16 died Kilkenny 1–13
 National Hurling League – Cork 2–14 beat Waterford 0–13

Golf
Men's professional
 Masters Tournament – Mark O'Meara
 U.S. Open – Lee Janzen
 British Open – Mark O'Meara
 PGA Championship – Vijay Singh
 PGA Tour money leader – David Duval – $2,591,031
 PGA Tour Player of the Year – Mark O'Meara
 PGA Tour Rookie of the Year – Steve Flesch
 Senior PGA Tour money leader – Hale Irwin – $2,861,945
Men's amateur
 British Amateur – Sergio García
 U.S. Amateur – Hank Kuehne
 European Amateur – Paddy Gribben
Women's professional
 Nabisco Dinah Shore – Pat Hurst
 LPGA Championship – Se Ri Pak
 U.S. Women's Open – Se Ri Pak
 Classique du Maurier – Brandie Burton
 LPGA Tour money leader – Annika Sörenstam – $1,092,748
 The Solheim Cup is retained by the United States team who beat the European team 16 to 12.

Handball
 Men's European Championship: Sweden
 Women's European Championship: Norway

Harness racing
 North America Cup – Straight Path
 United States Pacing Triple Crown races –
 Cane Pace – Shady Character
 Little Brown Jug – Shady Character
 Messenger Stakes – Fit For Life
 United States Trotting Triple Crown races –
 Hambletonian – Muscles Yankee
 Yonkers Trot – Muscles Yankee
 Kentucky Futurity – Trade Balance
 Australian Inter Dominion Harness Racing Championship –
 Pacers: Our Sir Vancelot
 Trotters: Buster Hanover

Horse racing
Steeplechases
 Cheltenham Gold Cup – Cool Dawn
 Grand National – Earth Summit
Flat races
 Australia – Melbourne Cup – Jezabeel
 Canada – Queen's Plate – Archers Bay
 Dubai – Dubai World Cup won by Silver Charm	
 France – Prix de l'Arc de Triomphe – Sagamix
 Ireland – Irish Derby Stakes – Dream Well
 Japan – Japan Cup won by El Condor Pasa
 English Triple Crown races:
 2,000 Guineas Stakes – King of Kings
 The Derby – High-Rise
 St. Leger Stakes – Nedawi
 United States Triple Crown races:
 Kentucky Derby – Real Quiet
 Preakness Stakes – Real Quiet
 Belmont Stakes – Victory Gallop
 Breeders' Cup World Thoroughbred Championships:
 Breeders' Cup Classic – Awesome Again
 Breeders' Cup Distaff – Escena
 Breeders' Cup Juvenile – Answer Lively
 Breeders' Cup Juvenile Fillies – Silverbulletday
 Breeders' Cup Mile – Da Hoss
 Breeders' Cup Sprint – Reraise
 Breeders' Cup Turf – Buck's Boy

Ice hockey
 For the first time, professional players from the National Hockey League participate in the Winter Olympics. And also for the first time in Olympic history, women took part in ice hockey.
 Women's Gold – United States won 3–1 over Canada
 Men's Gold – Czech Republic won 1–0 over Russia
 Art Ross Trophy as the NHL's leading scorer during the regular season: Jaromír Jágr, Pittsburgh Penguins
 Hart Memorial Trophy – for the NHL's Most Valuable Player: Dominik Hašek – Buffalo Sabres
 Stanley Cup – Detroit Red Wings defeated the Washington Capitals 4 games to 0.
 World Hockey Championship
 Men's champion: Sweden defeated Finland
 Junior Men's champion: Russia defeated Canada

Lacrosse
 The 8th World Lacrosse Championship is held in Baltimore, Maryland. The United States win, and Canada is the runner–up.
 The Philadelphia Wings sweep the Baltimore Thunder in the best of three series held to determine the winner of the Champion's Cup.
 The Brampton Excelsiors win the Mann Cup.
 The Clarington Green Gaels win the Founders Cup.
 The Burnaby Lakers win the Minto Cup.

Mixed martial arts
The following is a list of major noteworthy MMA events during 1998 in chronological order.

|-
|align=center style="border-style: none none solid solid; background: #e3e3e3"|Date
|align=center style="border-style: none none solid solid; background: #e3e3e3"|Event
|align=center style="border-style: none none solid solid; background: #e3e3e3"|Alternate Name/s
|align=center style="border-style: none none solid solid; background: #e3e3e3"|Location
|align=center style="border-style: none none solid solid; background: #e3e3e3"|Attendance
|align=center style="border-style: none none solid solid; background: #e3e3e3"|PPV Buyrate
|align=center style="border-style: none none solid solid; background: #e3e3e3"|Notes
|-align=center
|March 13
|UFC 16: Battle in the Bayou
|
| New Orleans, Louisiana, US
|4,600
|
|
|-align=center
|March 15
|Pride 2
|
| Yokohama, Japan
|
|
|
|-align=center
|May 15
|UFC 17: Redemption
|
| Mobile, Alabama, US
|
|
|
|-align=center
|June 24
|Pride 3
|
| Tokyo, Japan
|
|
|
|-align=center
|October 11
|Pride 4
|
| Tokyo, Japan
|
|
|
|-align=center
|October 16
|UFC Brazil: Ultimate Brazil
|UFC 17.5
| São Paulo, Brazil
|
|
|
|-align=center

Motorsport

Rugby league

1998 NRL season
1998 NRL grand final
Super League III
1998 Super League Grand Final
1998 State of Origin series
1998 New Zealand season
1998 New Zealand tour of Great Britain
1997–98 French Championship season
1998–99 French Championship season

Rugby union
 104th Five Nations Championship series is won by France who complete the Grand Slam
 Tri Nations series is won by South Africa for the first time, with a clean sweep of victories. South Africa goes on to equal New Zealand's all-time record of 17 consecutive test victories.

Snooker
 World Snooker Championship – John Higgins beats Ken Doherty 18–12
 World rankings – John Higgins becomes world number one for 1998/99

Swimming
 Eighth FINA World Championships, held in Perth, Australia (January 8 –  17)
 Second European SC Championships, held in Sheffield, United Kingdom (December 11 – December 13)
 December 1 –  American swimmer Jenny Thompson breaks her own world record in the women's 100m butterfly (short course): 56:90
 December 13 – Mark Foster twice breaks the world record in the men's 50m freestyle (short course) during the European SC Championships in Sheffield, clocking 21.31 eventually.

Tennis
Grand Slam in tennis men's results:
 Australian Open – Petr Korda
 French Open – Carlos Moyá
 Wimbledon championships – Pete Sampras
 U.S. Open – Patrick Rafter
Grand Slam in tennis women's results:
 Australian Open – Martina Hingis
 French Open – Arantxa Sánchez Vicario
 Wimbledon championships – Jana Novotná
 U.S. Open – Lindsay Davenport
 Davis Cup – Sweden wins 4–1 over Italy in world tennis.

Volleyball
 Men's World Championship: Italy
 Women's World Championship: Cuba

Water polo
 Men's World Championship: Spain
 Women's World Championship: Italy

Weightlifting
 The 1998 World Weightlifting Championships were held in Lahti, Finland from November 7 to November 15.

Multi-sport events
 1998 Winter Olympics held in Nagano, Japan
 Germany wins the most medals (29), and the most gold medals (12)
 Asian Games held in Bangkok, Thailand
 1998 Commonwealth Games held in Kuala Lumpur, Malaysia
 Central American and Caribbean Games held in Maracaibo, Venezuela
 Summer Goodwill Games held in New York City, United States

Awards
 Associated Press Male Athlete of the Year – Mark McGwire, Major League Baseball
 Associated Press Female Athlete of the Year – Se Ri Pak, LPGA golf

References

 
Sports by year